The Poly D is an analog synthesizer first made by Behringer in 2019. The Poly D is based largely on the Moog Minimoog, which was first produced from 1970-1981. The Poly D is the sixth such vintage synthesizer that Behringer has cloned.

Release
In 2016, Behringer announced that they would be releasing their first ever production synth for retail, the Deepmind 12/6, followed shortly thereafter by the Deepmind 12D, a desktop variant of the Deepmind. These synths were in turn followed the Neutron, Crave, TD-3 and Model D.

On November 27th, 2019, Behringer announced that they would be releasing the Poly D, though at the time only pre orders were available from Thomann. The Poly D was originally priced at £599 or €699, respectively.

Design and features
The Poly D weighs 22.5 pounds and has dimensions of 90 x 648 x 361 mm. The synth has four analog oscillators, which can be merged into one voice, two voices with two oscillators per voice, or split into one voice per oscillator. The oscillators are analog, not digital, and thus require occasional tuning.

There are wooden panels on either side, and the back panel is made of black aluminium, closely resembling a Minimoog. The marketable differences from the Minimoog lie in the addition of aftertouch, the BBD Stereo Chorus, DS-1 modeled distortion circuit, Behringer arpeggiator and 32 step sequencer, and the aforementioned switchable voice modes.

See also
 Minimoog
 Behringer
 Synthesizer clone

References

External Links
 Poly D Quick Start Guide at the Musictribe and Behringer Website. Retrieved February 11th, 2022.

Musical instruments invented in the 2010s
Synthesizers